Değirmenli is the adjectival form of the Turkish word değirmen for "mill", and therefore literally "with mills". It may refer to the following places in Turkey:

 Değirmenli, Ardahan
 Değirmenli, Çat
 Değirmenli, Çermik
 Değirmenli, Ceyhan
 Değirmenli, Dicle
 Değirmenli, İspir
 Değirmenli, Manavgat

See also
Değirmencik (disambiguation)
Değirmendere (disambiguation)